Hafod Garegog National Nature Reserve is a national nature reserve located near the village of Nantmor, about 6 kilometres north of Porthmadog in Gwynedd.

In this reserve, peaty hollows run between three parallel ridges of woodland-covered rock. Fine views can be enjoyed in all directions, with Snowdon and the Aberglaslyn pass providing a stunning landscape to the north, whilst the Moelwyn range fills the skyline to the east. To the south, the broad valley of the River Glaslyn rolls out towards the sea.

External links
 

National nature reserves in Wales